Mueang Chiang Rai is the capital district (amphoe mueang) of Chiang Rai province, northern Thailand.

Geography
Neighboring districts are (from the northwest clockwise) Mae Fa Luang, Mae Chan, Wiang Chiang Rung, Wiang Chai, Thoeng, Pa Daet, Phan, Mae Lao, Mae Suai of Chiang Rai Province and Mae Ai of Chiang Mai province.

The Phi Pan Nam Mountains dominate the landscape of the southern side of the district. The Kok River is an important water resource.

Administration
The district is divided into 16 subdistricts (tambons), which are further subdivided into 256 villages (mubans). The city (thesaban nakhon) Chiang Rai covers tambon Wiang and parts of Rop Wiang, San Sai, and Rim Kok. The township (thesaban tambon) San Sai covers parts of tambons San Sai, and Ban Du tambon Ban Du. There are a further 14 tambon administrative organizations (TAO).

References

External links

amphoe.com (Thai)

Mueang Chiang Rai